Iovance Biotherapeutics, Inc. is a biopharmaceutical startup based in San Carlos, California. The company works to develop tumor-infiltrating lymphocyte (TIL) therapies against cancer.

History
The company was founded in 2007 as Genesis Biopharma. In 2013, Lion merged with Genesis Biopharma аnd became lion bio Pharma, then rebranded to Iovance in 2017.

Drug pipeline
Iovance has a TIL treatment undergoing clinical trials against melanoma (investigational id: LN-144, tradename: Lifileucel). Iovance is investigating a TIL therapy against cervical and head and neck cancers (investigational id: LN-145).

See also
Kite Pharma

References

External links

Biotechnology companies of the United States
Pharmaceutical companies established in 2007
Biotechnology companies established in 2013
Health care companies based in California
Companies listed on the Nasdaq